Gretton is a hamlet in the civil parish of Cardington, in the Shropshire district, in the ceremonial county of Shropshire. It lies immediately to the east of Cardington village. In 1870-72 the township had a population of 73.

See also
Listed buildings in Cardington, Shropshire

References

External links 

Hamlets in Shropshire
Shrewsbury and Atcham
Cardington, Shropshire